Liliko Ogasawara is a former international competitor in judo who competed for the United States in Judo at the 1996 Summer Olympics. Ogasawara was born on May 21, 1972, in Englewood, New Jersey.

Raised in Montvale, New Jersey, Ogasawara attended Pascack Hills High School, who became the first New Jersey girl to compete against boys in a high school interscholastic match, when she participated in four matches in 1989.

Martial arts career
She trained in judo from the age of three. She was placed in several national championships. She also won over 10 golds in international competitions. She won silver in the 1993 World Judo Championships and bronze at the 1995 World Championships in Japan while living in San Jose, California. A hamstring injury stopped her from being able to fully train for Judo at the 1996 Summer Olympics. She would compete in the 1996 Atlanta Olympic Games. She competed in the 66 kg division (146 lbs) and tied for 7th place on losing to Wang Xianbo of China.

Author
Nagayasu Ogasawara and Liliko Ogasawara were the authors of a Judo video series White to Black.

Personal life
She is the singer of Sessomorte.
She is a 5th degree blackbelt in Judo. She is a licensed clinical alcohol and drug counselor and licensed professional counselor in New Jersey.

References

Living people
Judoka trainers
American female judoka
Martial arts writers
Judoka at the 1996 Summer Olympics
American sportspeople of Japanese descent
Olympic judoka of the United States
1972 births
World judo champions
Pan American Games medalists in judo
Pan American Games silver medalists for the United States
Pan American Games bronze medalists for the United States
Judoka at the 1991 Pan American Games
Judoka at the 1995 Pan American Games
People from Englewood, New Jersey
People from Montvale, New Jersey
Pascack Hills High School alumni
Sportspeople from Bergen County, New Jersey
21st-century American women